The 2005 IBF World Championships (World Badminton Championships) took place in Arrowhead Pond in Anaheim, United States, between August 15 and August 21, 2005. Following the results in the women's singles.

Seeds
 Zhang Ning, Runner-up
 Xie Xingfang, Champion
 Pi Hongyan, Quarter-final
 Wang Chen, Quarter-final
 Yao Jie, Third round
 Xu Huaiwen, Semi-final
 Tracey Hallam, Quarter-final
 Zhou Mi, First round
 Eriko Hirose, Third round
 Petya Nedeltcheva, First round
 Kanako Yonekura, Second round
 Kaori Mori, Quarter-final
 Mia Audina Tjiptawan, Third round
 Salakjit Ponsana, Third round
 Xing Aiying, First round
 Li Li, Third round

Main stage

Section 1

Section 2

Section 3

Section 4

Final stage

External links 
2005 IBF results

- Women's singles, 2005 Ibf World Championships
IBF